Mario Cristián Osmín Briceño Portilla (born 20 June 1996) is a Chilean footballer who plays as a winger for Unión San Felipe.

Honours
Universidad de Chile
Primera División: 2017–C

Ñublense
Primera B: 2020

References

External links
 
 Profile at Universidad de Chile

Living people
1996 births
People from La Serena
Chilean footballers
Chilean Primera División players
Primera B de Chile players
Deportes La Serena footballers
Universidad de Chile footballers
C.D. Antofagasta footballers
Curicó Unido footballers
A.C. Barnechea footballers
Ñublense footballers
Lautaro de Buin footballers
Rangers de Talca footballers
Unión San Felipe footballers
Association football wingers
Doping cases in association football